Manuel Arce y Ochotorena (18 August 1879 – 16 September 1948) was a Spanish Cardinal of the Roman Catholic Church who served as Archbishop of Tarragona from 1944 until his death, and was elevated to the cardinalate in 1946 by Pope Pius XII.

Biography
Born in Ororbia, Navarre, Manuel Arce y Ochotorena attended the seminaries in Pamplona and Zaragoza before going to Rome to study at the Pontifical Gregorian University and the Angelicum. He was ordained to the priesthood on 17 July 1904 and then taught at Pamplona's seminary. Also serving as vicar capitular and vicar general of Pamplona, Ochotorena was made an Apostolic Protonotary on 3 December 1926.

On 5 February 1929 he was appointed Bishop of Zamora by Pope Pius XI. He received his episcopal consecration on the following June 16 from Archbishop Federico Tedeschini, with Bishops Tomás Muñiz Pablos and Mateo Múgica y Urrestarazu serving as co-consecrators, in the Cathedral of Pamplona.

A witness to Ochotorena's actions during the White Terror perpetrated by Francisco Franco and the Nationalist faction during the Spanish Civil War stated: "Many priests acted very badly. The bishop of Zamora in 1936 was more or less an assassin – I don't remember his name. He must be held responsible because prisoners appealed to him to save their lives. All he would reply was that the Reds had killed more people than the falangist were killing."

Ochotorena was later made Bishop of Oviedo on 22 January 1938 and Archbishop of Tarragona on 29 March 1944. Pope Pius XII created him Cardinal-Priest of Ss. Vitale, Valeria, Gervasio e Protasio in the consistory of 18 February 1946.

The Cardinal died in Tarragona, at age 69. He is buried in the metropolitan cathedral of that same city.

References

External links
Cardinals of the Holy Roman Church
Catholic-Hierarchy

1879 births
1948 deaths
People from Cuenca de Pamplona
20th-century Spanish cardinals
Cardinals created by Pope Pius XII
Archbishops of Tarragona
Bishops of Oviedo
20th-century Roman Catholic archbishops in Spain
Bishops of Zamora
Basque Roman Catholic priests